Raw Air is the no break ten-day tournament in ski jumping and ski flying in four venues across Norway. Founded by Arne Åbråten, it is organized as part of the FIS World Cup.

Competition

Prize money

Locations 
Men's competition will be held on four different ski jumping hills in this order: Oslo (Holmenkollbakken), Lillehammer (Lysgårdsbakken), Trondheim (Granåsen) and Vikersund (Vikersundbakken). 

Women's competition will be held on three hills other than Vikersund.

Format 
The competition will last for ten days in a row, with no break and 10 events with total of 16 rounds from individual events, team events and qualifications (prologues):

Hosts

Map

Hill records

Edition

Men

Women

References 

 
FIS Ski Jumping World Cup
Ski jumping competitions in Norway
International sports competitions hosted by Norway
Holmenkollen
Sport in Oslo
Sport in Lillehammer
Sport in Trondheim
Modum
Recurring sporting events established in 2017
2017 establishments in Norway